Nomada sphaerogaster is a rare species of nomad bee in the family Apidae. It is found in North America.

References 

Nomadinae
Insects described in 1903